Acantholimon trojanum, also known as prickly thrift, is a species of perennial plant. It is native to Turkey and can survive in hardiness zones 5a to 9b. The species typically reaches a height of around 1.2 meters (4 ft). Acantholimon trojanum grows in rocky soil and has a foliage colour of green and blue with flowers being pink, and blooms in the summer. The leaves are food items for deer and rabbit species.

Reference 

trojanum
Plants described in 1987